St. Joseph's Priory, Maria Roggendorf is a Benedictine priory located in the long-established pilgrimage centre of Maria Roggendorf in the district of Hollabrunn in Lower Austria.

It was founded on 7 September 1991 by Göttweig Abbey and recognised as an independent priory on 11 December 2005. It is a member of the Austrian Congregation of the Benedictine Confederation.

References

Benedictine monasteries in Austria
Christian organizations established in 1991
Monasteries in Lower Austria
1991 establishments in Austria
20th-century architecture in Austria